Zhan Rural District is a rural district (dehestan) in the Central District of Dorud County, Lorestan Province, Iran. At the 2006 census, its population was 20,175, in 4,287 families.  The rural district has 37 villages.

References 

Rural Districts of Lorestan Province
Dorud County